David Harding Getches was dean and Raphael J. Moses Professor of Natural Resources Law at the University of Colorado Law School in Boulder, Colorado.  He taught and wrote on water law, public land law, environmental law, and Indian law.

Biography 
Getches was born in Abington, Pennsylvania in 1942. He received his B.A. in political science from Occidental College.  He received his J.D. degree from the University of Southern California Law School and was admitted to the California Bar in 1968.

He worked for a year at the San Diego law firm of Luce, Forward, Hamilton & Scripps, then in 1968 became co-Directing Attorney at the California Indian Legal Services in Escondido. From  he founded and then served as executive director of the Native American Rights Fund (NARF), a nonprofit law firm specializing in Native American issues.  While at NARF, he served as lead counsel on the controversial case United States v. Washington, 384 F.Supp 312 (W.D. Wash. 1974), also known as the Boldt Decision, a case that affirmed the right of most Indian tribes in Washington State to harvest salmon.  From , he worked with his law partner Bruce Greene at Getches and Greene.

Getches joined the law faculty at the University of Colorado School of Law in 1979. While at the school, he served as faculty advisor to the Natural Resources Law Center, Colorado Journal of International Environmental Law and Policy, Indian Law Clinic, and other programs.

In 2003, he was appointed to serve as Dean of the law school.  While serving as Dean, he led the effort to build the Wolf Law Building, a building notable on the campus for having 100% of its electrical power drawn from renewable energy sources.  In addition to classroom and lab space, it houses the William A. Wise Law Library, which is the most comprehensive law library in the 12-state Rocky Mountain region and one of the largest in the country.  In 2009, the Natural Resources Law Teachers Committee awarded Getches the Clyde O. Martz Teaching Award for excellence in teaching natural resources law.

On June 30, 2011, Getches stepped down from his position as Dean.  He died of an aggressive and advanced form of pancreatic cancer on July 5, 2011.  The next day, the National Congress of American Indians (NCAI) unanimously voted to give Getches the NCAI Lifetime Achievement Award, which is one of its highest honors.  The award is given to individuals who produce significant and influential work that honors the place of American Indian nations, cultures and governments through a lifetime of work and personal dedication.  The Native American Rights Fund (NARF) dedicated the 2011 edition of its annual report to Getches, citing his lifetime of scholarship and litigation to advance Indian law. The CU Boulder Alumni Association presented him with the Robert L. Stearns Award for extraordinary achievement and service to the university and students.  The Class of 96 endowed the David H. Getches Scholarship in honor of his commitment and service to the University of Colorado Law School, and Colorado Law students benefit from tens of thousands of dollars in scholarships and fellowships distributed every year by other funds established in his honor.

In January 2013, the University of Colorado Law School created the Getches-Wilkinson Center for Natural Resources, Energy, and the Environment to support research in the areas of natural resources, energy and the environment.  The center was named for Professor Getches and Professor Charles Wilkinson to honor their contributions in these areas of study.

Public service 
David Getches served on nonprofit and public interest boards, committees, and councils in his areas of expertise and interest. Also in 1989, he was of Counsel to Centro de Derecho Ambiental y de los Recursos Naturales. From , he served on the Native American Lands Advisory Committee. He also served on the governing or senior advisory boards for the Center for Environmental Studies and Policy at the Fundación Neotropica Costa Rica, Rocky Mountain Mineral Law Foundation, The Trust for Public Land, Defenders of Wildlife, and Wilderness Society, among others.

Publications 
Professor Getches' publications included books, articles, Congressional testimony, speeches, litigation documents, and much more.  Getches' writings are preserved in a special collection at the Wise Law Library at the University of Colorado Law School.  Some of his better known works include:

Water Law in a Nutshell (1997)
Searching Out the Headwaters: Change and Rediscovery in Western Water Law and Policy, with Bates, MacDonnell and Wilkinson (1993)
Controlling Water Use:  The Unfinished Business of Water Quality Control, with MacDonnell and Rice (1991)
Water Resource Management, with Tarlock and Corbridge (1993)
Federal Indian Law, with Wilkinson and Williams (1998)

References

American legal scholars
Deans of law schools in the United States
State cabinet secretaries of Colorado
Occidental College alumni
University of Colorado faculty
University of Colorado Law School faculty
USC Gould School of Law alumni
Deaths from pancreatic cancer
2011 deaths
1942 births
People from Abington Township, Montgomery County, Pennsylvania
20th-century American lawyers
21st-century American lawyers